Shawndell Terell Winters (born November 5, 1980) is an American professional boxer. He has held the WBA-NABA heavyweight title since 2019. Winters had a late start to boxing, turning professional in the sport at 34 years of age. As an amateur, he competed at the National Golden Gloves on two occasions. In 2014 he placed second after losing to DeRae Crane and in 2012 he suffered an early defeat thus missing out on qualification into the quarterfinals. In February 2020, Winters received his first ever appearance in one of the four major sanctioning bodies rankings by the WBA.

Professional career 
In July 2016, Winters was confirmed to fight former Ghanaian olympian Maxwell Amponsah as the co-main event in Hammond, Indiana. He recorded a dominant fifth-round knockout after a right-hand staggered Amponsah before Winters finished with a flurry of punches that left his opponent face down on the canvas. The bout was immediately waved off for medical attention. The following year Winters fought in Elk Grove Village where he suffered his first defeat in an upset victory for Brian Howard. Winters redeemed himself after winning three consecutive knockout victories over Raymond Gray, Joe Jones, and Ryan Soft before receiving an eight-round majority decision loss in his second fight overseas against Nikodem Jeżewski.

Winters recorded an upset technical knockout win over undefeated heavyweight Oleksandr Teslenko in Brampton, Ontario on the latest United Boxing Promotions card. He landed an overhand right and began connecting many more combination punches until the referee intervened. Winters became the new North American Boxing Association champion. He then fought during November in Poland against Sergiej Werwejko. Winters produced a solid performance by dropping and outclassing Werwejko in the seventh round. In February 2020, it was announced Winters would fight former heavyweight world champion Joseph Parker in Frisco, Texas on the undercard of Mikey Garcia versus Jessie Vargas.

Professional boxing record

References

External links 

African-American boxers
American male boxers
1980 births
Living people
Heavyweight boxers
21st-century African-American sportspeople
20th-century African-American people